The Kim are a people of Chad, who mainly inhabit four villages in the Mayo-Kebbi Est region. The 1993 RGPH census reported a total population of 15,354 in Chad.

Principal economic activities include cultivation of finger millet, taro, and rice, fishing, and pottery.

Ethnic groups in Chad